Zano, Burkina Faso may refer to:

Zano, Bam, Burkina Faso
Zano, Boulgou, Burkina Faso